Squacquerone is an Italian cheese soft and crumbly type, originally from Romagna.

Description
Squacquerone is a cow's milk cheese, made from whole milk, with a very short maturation. It is similar to crescenza, although the paste (white in color) is less consistent due to the high water content. It is made of pasteurized or raw milk, and is extremely soft, creamy, and spreadable. The color is ivory white and the taste notes are typically lactic, with a sweet-sour taste. It is one of the main products with which piadina is stuffed.

In addition to the common squacquerone, the Squacquerone di Romagna PDO is widespread, produced only in the designated area and in compliance with the relative regulations.

Etymology
The etymology, of Romagna origin, refers to the consistency that "squaglia" ("melts") due to the high presence of water.

See also

 Crescenza
 List of Italian cheeses

References 

Cow's-milk cheeses
Italian products with protected designation of origin
Cheeses with designation of origin protected in the European Union
Cuisine of Emilia-Romagna